This is a list of villages and settlements in Kwara State, Nigeria organised by local government area (LGA) and district/area (with postal codes also given).

By postal code

By electoral ward
Below is a list of polling units, including villages and schools, organised by electoral ward.

References

Kwara
Kwara State